Miroși is a commune in Argeș County, Muntenia, Romania. It is composed of two villages, Miroși and Surdulești.

Natives
Marius Diță

References

Communes in Argeș County
Localities in Muntenia